Mount Dawson-Lambton is a mountain,  high, standing  southwest of the summit of Mount Speyer in the Worcester Range. It was discovered by the British National Antarctic Expedition, 1901–04, and named after the Misses Dawson-Lambton, contributors to the expedition.

References 

Mountains of the Ross Dependency
Hillary Coast